Shewanella algicola is a Gram-negative, rod-shaped, aerobic and motile bacterium from the genus of Shewanella with a single polar flagella which has been isolated from the alga Sargassum thunbergii from the coast of Jeju Island on Korea.

References

External links
Type strain of Shewanella algicola at BacDive -  the Bacterial Diversity Metadatabase

Alteromonadales
Bacteria described in 2016